Gregory Owen Hutchinson (born 5 December 1957), known as G. O. Hutchinson, is a British classicist and academic, specialising in Latin literature, Ancient Greek literature, and Latin and Ancient Greek languages. Since October 2015, he has been the Regius Professor of Greek at the University of Oxford, and a Student (i.e. Fellow) of Christ Church, Oxford.

Early life and education
Hutchinson was born on 5 December 1957 in Hackney, London, England. He was educated at the City of London School, an all-boys private school in the City of London; he had been granted one of the free places funded by the Inner London Education Authority. He studied classics at Balliol College, Oxford, graduating with a Bachelor of Arts (BA) degree in 1979. He remained at Balliol to undertake postgraduate research and completed his Doctor of Philosophy (DPhil) degree in 1983. His doctoral thesis was titled "Aeschylus' Septem Contra Thebas: Text and commentary".

Academic career
From 1981 to 1984, while a postgraduate student, Hutchinson was also a research lecturer at Christ Church, Oxford. In 1984, he was elected a Fellow of Exeter College, Oxford. He was then a Tutor in classics at Exeter between 1984 and 2015. From 1996 to 1998, he was also Reader in Classical Literature in the Faculty of Classics. From 1998 to 2015, he was also Professor of Greek and Latin Languages and Literature at the University of Oxford.

In June 2015, Hutchinson was named as the next Regius Professor of Greek at Oxford following the retirement of Christopher Pelling, FBA, earlier in the year. He took up the appointment on 1 October 2015 and moved colleges to become a Student (equivalent to a fellow) of Christ Church, Oxford.

Personal life
In 1979, Hutchinson married Yvonne Downing. Together they have one daughter.

Selected works

Hutchinson, G. O. (2018). Plutarch's Rhythmic Prose. Oxford: Oxford University Press.

References

 

 
 
 

1957 births
British classical scholars
British Latinists
Scholars of Ancient Greek
Scholars of ancient Greek literature
Regius Professors of Greek (University of Oxford)
Fellows of Exeter College, Oxford
Living people
People from Hackney Central
People educated at the City of London School
Alumni of Balliol College, Oxford
Fellows of Christ Church, Oxford